Szaniawy-Matysy  is a village in the administrative district of Gmina Trzebieszów, within Łuków County, Lublin Voivodeship, in eastern Poland.

The village has a population of 500.

References

Szaniawy-Matysy